In mathematics, given a vector space X with an associated quadratic form q, written , a null vector or isotropic vector is a non-zero element x of X for which .

In the theory of real bilinear forms, definite quadratic forms and isotropic quadratic forms are distinct. They are distinguished in that only for the latter does there exist a nonzero null vector.

A quadratic space  which has a null vector is called a pseudo-Euclidean space.

A pseudo-Euclidean vector space may be decomposed (non-uniquely) into orthogonal subspaces A and B, where q is positive-definite on A and negative-definite on B. The null cone, or isotropic cone, of X consists of the union of balanced spheres:

The null cone is also the union of the isotropic lines through the origin.

Examples
The light-like vectors of Minkowski space are null vectors.

Null vectors are also used in the Newman–Penrose formalism approach to spacetime manifolds.

A composition algebra splits when it has a null vector; otherwise it is a division algebra.

In the Verma module of a Lie algebra there are null vectors.

References

 
 
 

Linear algebra
Quadratic forms